Lethal By the Kilo is the third and final studio album by Australian three-piece folk group Tiddas. The album was released in October 1998 and supported the released with a national tour. The album was nominated for Album of the Year at the Deadly Awards 1999. The group recorded a live album in 1999 and disbanded in May 2000.

Lou Bennett wrote the song "Waka Nini Yana" which in the Yorta Yorta language means "Where Are you Going?. She wrote the song after hearing her great grandmother Pricilla McCrae speaking Yorta Yorta.

Track listing

Release history

References

1998 albums
Tiddas (band) albums